Rahlau is a river of Hamburg, Germany. It flows into the Wandse in Wandsbek.

See also
List of rivers of Hamburg

Rivers of Hamburg
Rivers of Germany